The 2012 D.C. United season was the club's seventeenth season of existence, and their seventeenth consecutive season of playing in Major League Soccer, the top division of American soccer. The club's season began on March 10, with a 0–1 home defeat against Sporting Kansas City, and culminated on November 18 with a 1–1 draw against Houston Dynamo.

Under Ben Olsen, his second full season in charge, the club went through a tremendous improvement in form, qualifying for the playoffs for the first time since 2007, and reaching the Eastern Conference championship for the first time since 2006. During the regular season, United amassed 58 points during the season, which tied their record from 1998 for the most points during the regular season, although the 1998 season only had 32 matches instead of 34. Still, the club averaged 1.7 points per match, which is tied for the third best on record.

United saw success in the conference semifinals of the MLS Cup Playoffs, defeating their I-95 rivals, the New York Red Bulls 2–1 on aggregate, before eventually losing to the defending Eastern Conference postseason champions, Houston Dynamo, 4–2 on aggregate.

Outside of MLS, United reached the round of 16 of the U.S. Open Cup, where they lost in extra time to the Philadelphia Union.

Background 

Ahead of the 2012 season, it was head coach Ben Olsen's first club campaign as full-time manager. During 2011, United improve from their 6–20–4 record and improved to 9–13–12, but failing to qualify for the MLS Cup Playoffs for a franchise-record four seasons. United improved their scoring output, scoring 47 goals during the regular season, third in the league, and had the fourth best away record of MLS clubs during 2011.

Review

Preseason 

On November 3, United's Ethan White and Perry Kitchen were called up to the United States under-23 national team, ahead of November 7 and 15 fixtures in Germany. On November 29, D.C. United signed Robbie Russell from Real Salt Lake in exchange for a third round pick in the 2013 MLS SuperDraft.

Ahead of the 2011 MLS Re-Entry Draft, Dave Kasper, the club General Manager, released a list of nine players exposed for the Re-Entry Draft. These players' options to have their contracts extended were declined. The Re-Entry Draft resulted in United's Marc Burch and Clyde Simms being transferred to the Seattle Sounders FC and New England Revolution, respectively. On December 1, Charlie Davies' loan from Sochaux expired, with United having the option to purchase his contract from French outfitters. Despite the option, United declined to exercise their option to purchase Davies' contract from Sochaux, resulting in Davies returning to the club. Three days later, long-time United midfielder Santino Quaranta, whose contract was declined by United. During the actual Re-Entry Draft, held on December 5, United made no selections.

During the 2012 MLS SuperDraft, United made one selection in the draft, selecting Louisville Cardinals men's soccer standout, Nick DeLeon, with the seventh selection overall. DeLeon, a Generation adidas member, was subsequently signed by the club as an off-budget player. Two weeks later, during the 2012 MLS Supplemental Draft, United selected Lance Rozeboom from the University of New Mexico; Charles Rodriguez, from University of North Carolina at Charlotte, as well as Matt Kuhn from Drake University. Of the Supplemental selections, only Rozeboom was signed to a contract. The others were released without offers. Rozeboom, unfortunately, suffered a season-ending ACL injury during the Carolina Challenge Cup preseason tournament.

After what many cited as a quiet offseason for United, the club engaged in more winter trades following the Supplemental Draft. On January 18, United acquired Brazilian Maicon Santos from FC Dallas. Two days later, United traded an undisclosed amount of allocation money to fellow Texan MLS side, Houston Dynamo for midfielder Danny Cruz. After two domestic transfers, United acquired Argentine center-back Emiliano Dudar on a free transfer from Swiss side Young Boys.

United had their first two preseason scrimmages on January 29 and February 2, playing against fellow-MLS side, Chicago Fire and Swedish Allsvenskan-side, Malmö, respectively. Both matches ended in draws. Subsequently, DC United once again claimed the Carolina Challenge Cup with victories over the Charleston Battery and the Chicago Fire, with the final game against the Columbus Crew canceled because of severe weather.

On February 2, the club made headlines for the acquiring of Albanian striker Hamdi Salihi as a designated player, from Austrian side Rapid Wien. It was rumored that United outbid several European suitors, including Celtic and Rangers for Salihi. Many have cited the purchase of Salihi as United's largest transfer during the 2011–12 offseason, and a key role needed to fill the void left by Charlie Davies the previous season.

The club filled out the roster signing two preseason trialists from USL teams: goalkeeper Andrew Dykstra and left winger Lewis Neal. The club also loaned out Conor Shanosky to the Fort Lauderdale Strikers.

March 

D.C. United opened the Major League Soccer regular season at home against Sporting Kansas City on March 10. Sporting, the defending Eastern Conference regular season champions, defeated United at RFK Stadium, 1–0 in United's final outing of the 2011 MLS season. That scoreline was repeated in the first match of the 2012 season. In the 93rd minute, a stoppage time corner kick by Sporting's Graham Zusi by Sporting resulted in a heading goal by C. J. Sapong giving Sporting the 1–0 lead and eventual victory over United.

United's offensive struggles continued as they traveled out west to take on the Los Angeles Galaxy, the defending MLS Cup and Supporters' Shield champions, on March 17. The Galaxy emerged with a 3–1 win, with United's lone bright spot being rookie Nick DeLeon's first MLS goal, as the team's first round draft pick scored in the 86th minute. The two-match West Coast swing concluded with a March 24 fixture at Vancouver Whitecaps FC, which ended in a 0–0 draw. United's only scoring chance came on a header by Designated Player Hamdi Salihi, that forced Whitecaps' goalie Joe Cannon into a quick reaction save.

A month that was marked by anemic offensive performances ended with a goal-scoring explosion as United returned home to RFK Stadium to take on FC Dallas, and the emergence of new factor in the attack as Maicon Santos scored twice and added an assist in a 4–1 thrashing of the visitors. Nick DeLeon had his second goal of the campaign and he added an assist on a goal by Danny Cruz.

April 

During April, D.C. United went undefeated in their five league matches, winning thrice and drawing twice. The month opened with a regular season match at home to the Seattle Sounders FC. The fixture against Seattle ended in a scoreless draw, the club's second of the season, with United's Maicon Santos and Dejan Jakovic picking up yellow cards during the match. On April 14, United traveled northbound to take on Eastern Conference rivals, the New England Revolution at Gillette Stadium. After New England's José Moreno Mora opened up the scoresheet in the sixth minute, United equalized from a goal from Santos in the 19th minute. With nine minutes remaining, United's Chris Pontius received a pass from Emiliano Dudar and curled a shot around New England's Matt Reis, giving United a 2–1 lead and subsequent victory. The win marked the club's first victory at New England since August 5, 2007; when United earned a 3–0 victory at New England.

Following their victory at New England, United were in prime position to win consecutive league matches for the first time since June 2009. United, hot off a 2–1 victory at New England hosted struggling conference opponents, Montreal Impact, who were making their debutant season in MLS. In the April 18 affair, the Impact took the lead in the 68th minute off a strike from Bernardo Corradi. Montreal's lead quickly vanished as United's Santos restored parity in the 72nd minute. Santos would subsequently score, but the goal would be called back, giving United a 1–1 draw versus Montreal.

After the disappointing draw with Montreal, United put together the team's most dominant performance in April, with a 4–1 victory over the New York Red Bulls, led by Chris Pontius, who tallied his first career hat-trick with goals in the 8th, 32nd and 69th minutes. In between Nick DeLeon added a goal in the 35th minute. New York's Thierry Henry spoiled the shutout with a late free-kick goal.

United finally won consecutive matches when they closed out the month with a 3–2 home win over the Houston Dynamo. A header by Maicon Santos gave United the early lead in a first half controlled by United. A hamstring injury to Emiliano Dudar just before halftime helped the Dynamo back into the game. Playing a makeshift back line, United surrendered the lead in the 50th minute, thanks to a goal by the previous year's nemesis, Will Bruin. United regained the lead four minutes later, when Dwayne De Rosario scored his first goal of the season, but gave back the lead when Bruin added another goal in the 59th minute against a back line that clearly missed Dudar. United rebounded with a stunning game-winning header by Santos in the 70th minute.

May 

May began with United playing their 5th game in 18 days and with a back line that had one healthy center-back, Brandon McDonald. The other center-backs, Emiliano Dudar, Dejan Jakovic and Ethan White, were all out due to injuries. Playing the hottest team in the league, the San Jose Earthquakes, the defenseless United surrendered 5 goals in a 5–3 defeat. The game started well for United with a goal by Dwayne De Rosario in the eighth minute. However, the disorganized United defense gave up three goals in a flurry before halftime, on goals by Chris Wondolowski, Steven Lenhart and Justin Morrow. United drew close, when Daniel Woolard scored a diving header in the 64th minute. San Jose soon pulled away as Wondowlowski and Lenhart each scored their second goal of the game. Although the game was out of reach, United fans were buoyed with a late goal by substitute Hamdi Salihi, in the 88th minute. Salihi, United's much-hyped offseason signing, scored for the first time in league play, when he got on the end of a long pass by De Rosario, and neatly chipped it over the diving San Jose goalie, Jon Busch.

Following the loss at San Jose, United had no break in the schedule with another road game 4 days later. The team did catch somewhat of a lucky break as they were playing winless Toronto FC. Head Coach Ben Olsen had a few surprises in store, as he bolstered the defense by putting Andy Najar at right back and moving Woolard to center-back. Bill Hamid was back in goal for the first time since United's season opener. Hamid's slot as the team's starting goalkeeper had gone to Joe Willis based on Willis' strong performances while Hamid was with the USA's U23 team in that team's failed effort at Olympic qualifying. After a defensive first half, with few chances for either team, United broke through on a long strike by Chris Pontius in the 55th minute. Hamdi Salihi once again came off the bench and closed out the scoring in a 2–0 win with his second goal in two games, this one coming on an acrobatic overhead scissors kick.

Upon the victory at Toronto, United faced the Houston Dynamo in a rematch from April 28, when United won 3–2. The match was a special occasion for the Dynamo, as the club was opening their brand-new soccer-specific stadium, BBVA Compass Stadium. The hosts would earn a 1–0 victory thanks to a 67th-minute strike from Houston's Brad Davis, who volley a 35-yard shot.

The three game road swing ended following the Houston match, where United began a three-match homestand against Colorado Rapids, Toronto FC and New England Revolution, respectively. United are riding on a two-match winning streak, defeating Colorado and Toronto by two-goal score lines. On May 26, United will play host to the Revolution.

Following these league fixtures, United will conclude the month of May with the start of their U.S. Open Cup campaign. Entering in the third round proper, United will travel south on the I-95 corridor to take on USL Pro side, Richmond Kickers. To be played at Richmond's City Stadium, this will mark the first matchup between the two sides since 2010, but the first time since 2008 that the Kickers will host United.

June 

Due to breaks from the FIFA international calendar, D.C. United only played three league matches during June, all of which were in the second half of the month. Aside from their three regular season fixtures, United played a fourth round match of the U.S. Open Cup. Across all competitions, United earned a record of a pair of wins and losses, and zero ties.

Their first match of the month was the Open Cup match on June 5, where United hosted the Philadelphia Union at the Maryland SoccerPlex in Boyds, Maryland. For the two rivals, this was the first time the sides met one another in the domestic cup competition. Former United midfielder, Brian Carroll of the Union netted the opening goal in stoppage time of the first half, only for United's Josh Wolff to equalize minutes later. The 1–1 gridlock would stand through regulation time. Since the Open Cup does not feature replay matches, the match was decided in extra time. During extra time, Philadelphia's Antoine Hoppenot netted the eventual match-winning goal just three minutes into extra time, giving the Union a berth into the quarterfinals, and eliminating United's Open Cup odds. It was the second consecutive tournament that United failed to earn a place in the quarterfinals or deeper in the Open Cup.

Eleven days later, the two sides would meet again in MLS league play, but at the Union's PPL Park. In years past, United had failed to defeat the Union in Philadelphia, losing both their outings by 3–2 score lines. The chippy affair saw Philadelphia dominate possession, but in spite of this, United came away with a 1–0 road victory, thanks to a goal from United striker, Chris Pontius in the 78th minute. The win gave United their fourth consecutive win in league play for the first time since 2007, and saw them top the Eastern Conference for the first time since 2009.

The fact United topped the Eastern Conference, while their Atlantic Cup rivals, the New York Red Bulls were second the conference added extra weight to the league meeting between the two sides. In front of a Red Bull Arena sell-out crowd of 25,187; the June 24 match between the Red Bulls and United saw the Black-and-Red score their quickest goal in franchise history, with Pontius scoring 31 seconds into the match off of a Danny Cruz cross. New York answered in the 20th minute, with ex-United midfielder, Brandon Barklage tallying a goal in the 20th minute, his first with the Red Bulls. Barklage scored his second Red Bulls career goal inside three minutes of the second half, giving the Red Bulls a 2–1 advantage over United. Along with Barklage, New York's Jan Gunnar Solli scored his first career goal with the club, giving the Red Bulls a 3–1 lead in the 55th minute. The two-goal advantage was short-lived, however, as Pontius netted again for United just nine minutes later. A teasing pass from Maicon Santos saw Pontius dribble around Red Bulls goalie, Ryan Meara and easily slot it into the back of the net. Ultimately, the match would end in New York's favor, winning 3–2, additionally the Red Bulls earned their first victory against United at Red Bull Arena, and won at home against their rivals for the first time since August 10, 2008.

With the loss, D.C. and New York drew level atop the Eastern Conference standings.

July 

July was an otherwise quiet month for D.C. United, as the club only played two regular season fixtures, and a mid-season friendly match. The lack of matches during the span was primarily due to the FIFA International Match Calendar and MLS's desire not to have conflicting dates with the match calendar.

In league play, July was a rather frustrating patch, as D.C. United lost two games by a combined score of 5–0, losing by four to Houston Dynamo and one against Columbus Crew, both matches being on the road. The lopsided result against Houston was largely due to the ejection of starting goalkeeper, Bill Hamid, 20 minutes in, when United and the Dynamo were drawn at zero.

D.C. United also played Paris-Saint Germain of France and drew 1–1.

August 

If July was a down month, then August was an up and down month for D.C. United. An early second half goal by Pontius was enough for a 1–0 home win over Columbus, but United next dropped a road match in Kansas City, despite a first-half goal by DeLeon. With two home games next, United was able to secure a draw against the Union, despite an early goal by former D.C. United regular Brian Carroll. United scored the tying goal on an own goal that came on a free kick taken by Branko Bošković, but Bošković was ejected 20 minutes later because of a scrum after De Rosario had seemingly earned the win for United with penalty kick goal in the 87th minute. An encroachment call nullified the goal, and De Rosario missed on the second try. The offense was back in gear for a 4–2 win over Chicago Fire, thanks to goals by De Rosario, Pajoy and the unlikely pair of McDonald and Tan. A trip to Montreal resulted in a 3–0 drubbing, but United seemed in position to close out the month with a win at home, holding a 2–1 lead over New York, thanks to goals by DeLeon and De Rosario. Unfortunately, the  team surrendered a late goal and had to settle for a point.

September 

D.C. United started the month with a disappointing 1–0 loss in Salt Lake. As disappointing as the loss was, the team soon got much worse news, as De Rosario injured his knee on international duty with the Canadian national team. Without his primary attacking threat, Olsen quickly changed his tactics to a much more defensive set and approach, which would come to be known as "Bennyball." In their first match without their captain, the team fell behind at home against New England, but thanks to the heroic efforts of Pontius, the team rallied for a 2–1 win. Pontius had a goal and assisted on the winning goal, Lewis Neal's first ever for D.C. In their next match, against Philadelphia, D.C. only generated a couple of chances, but they scored on one of them, when Pontius got on the end of a pass, forcing the goalie to challenge him and passed to a wide open Pajoy, who scored the game's only goal in a 1–0 win. The team continued their stingy ways in their return home, eking out a 1–0 win over lowly Chivas USA, on a second half goal by one-time Designated Player Branko Bošković. The goal was also noteworthy as the one and only regular season goal that Bošković scored in his time with the team. A trip to Portland produced another point, but a penalty goal by Pontius was not enough for the win, as United surrendered the tying goal in the 70th minute. Still United had closed out the month with 3 straight wins followed by a draw, all coming after De Rosario's season-ending injury.

October 

D.C.'s stunning unbeaten streak continued with a 1–0 home win against Toronto FC, setting up  a crucial match against Columbus in United's final regular season home game of the year. A playoff spot was on the line, and a sell-out crowd watched the most exciting match of the season. United fell behind on an early goal by the Crew's Eddie Gaven, but the home team evened the score in the 39th minute, on a goal by DeLeon. Two minutes later, Columbus was back in the lead, on a goal by Jairo Arrieta. Marcelo Saragosa leveled the score for D.C. in the 59th minute. The score remained 2–2 until the first minute of stoppage time. Hamdi Salihi won a loose ball in the defensive end, and passed the ball back to Chris Korb, who sent a hopeful long ball for Bošković. The Montenegrin Bošković hit a one-time left-footed volley over a defender towards a wide-open Neal, who hit a one-time volley of his own, past the onrushing goalkeeper, and securing United's first playoff spot since 2007. United closed out the regular season and a season-best seven-game unbeaten streak with a 1–1 draw in Chicago, thanks to a goal by Pajoy.

November 

In the Eastern Conference semi-finals round of the 2012 MLS Cup playoffs, D.C. United faced arch-foe New York Red Bulls in what would become one of the most memorable playoff series in league history. The opening match of the home-and-home series was played in Washington, effectively giving New York the home field advantage of hosting the return match, despite the fact that United had finished higher in the standings. The game would have been played at Red Bull Arena, but New Jersey was still struggling to recover from the devastation wreaked by Hurricane Sandy. In the series opener, the teams drew 1–1, trading own goals midway through the second half. New York defender Roy Miller sent an attempted clearance into New York's net in the 60th minute. New York was awarded the tying goal, when Bill Hamid went up to take a header into the box away from a Red Bull defender who was standing directly in front of United's goalie. Hamid fell back into the goal while holding the ball, though he tried to keep it out. The ball was ruled across the line and no foul was given, leaving the teams deadlocked heading into the return match. United would also have to play that match without the gifted Andy Najar who received a second yellow card ejection for throwing a ball at a New York player with about 20 minutes remaining.

It was the return match that really indelibly stamped this series into the pages of league history. The weather once-again played havoc with this series. A large contingent of D.C. United fans left the Washington area in a convoy of 11 buses as snowflakes were beginning to fall in the mid-Atlantic region. By the time they reached New Jersey, they were in the midst of a potent nor'easter. Few local fans even turned up for the game, but MLS did not immediately postpone the match. As grounds crew and even the league's top two executives tried to clear snow from the field, the rival coaches argued with the league officials and the referees about whether to play the match. United's coach Olsen was adamant that they should play, but after a delay of 45 minutes, the league finally decided to postpone the match by a day. Fewer D.C. United supporters were available to make the trip back up the highway the next day, but those who did were rewarded with a victory that would become legend.

The D.C. United goal was under a nearly-constant, withering assault almost the entire match, but Hamid made one spectacular save after another to keep the match scoreless until the 69th minute. That's when referee Mark Geiger showed Hamid a straight red card, after the goalie had come out to defend a breakaway by Red Bulls' striker Kenny Cooper and either did or did not initiate contact with Cooper. An irate Hamid was replaced by back-up 'keeper Joe Willis, who would carve his name into the team's annals and the hearts of United fans forever. Cooper beat Willis on the spot kick, beat referee Geiger ordered a retake because of encroachment by two Red Bulls players. Willis confidently dove left and blocked Cooper's second attempt. United was forced to play short-handed for a short time, but a reckless tackle against Pontius by the Red Bulls' Rafa Marquez earned a second yellow card and ejection. Shortly before stoppage time, D.C. went ahead, as a deft pass by defender Robbie Russell found Nick DeLeon. who slipped the ball over the sliding New York goalkeeper for what seemed to be the series winning goal. However, the Red Bulls had an excellent opportunity to force extra-time as they lined up a free kick on the edge of the penalty area during stoppage time. Despite having one of the greatest players in the history of the sport, Thierry Henry, who was also one of the great set-piece takers, the Red Bulls players decided to let Miller take the kick, and he sent it over the net. United left New Jersey with a 2–1 aggregate score series victory.

The Eastern Conference championship series could not match the semi-final for drama, but it was not without its own share of drama. D.C. United traveled to Houston for the opening match. DeLeon gave United a 1–0 lead in the 27th minute. United seemed poised to take control of the series when Raphael Augusto, who was making his first start, was taken down by Dynamo defender André Hainault on a breakaway opportunity. This seemed to be a clear automatic red card situation, but no foul was even called  on the play. Spared the red card ejection, Hainault evened the score in the second half with a goal of his own. Two more goals, one by Will Bruin and the other by Kofi Sarkodie left the Dynamo in a commanding position heading into the return match in Washington. The loss ended United's nine-game unbeaten streak. In the return match, Houston struck first, on a goal by Oscar Boniek Garcia to take an insurmountable lead. A late goal by Bošković made the aggregate score 4–2, but United could draw no closer, ending their remarkable season.

Competitions

Preseason

Florida training camp

Arizona training camp

Carolina Challenge Cup

Major League Soccer

Standings 
Eastern Conference Table

Overall table

Results summary

Results by round

Matches

MLS Cup Playoffs

Conference semifinals

Conference finals

U.S. Open Cup

MLS Reserve League

World Football Challenge

Club information

Roster and staff 

First team

As of May 9, 2012.

Reserve team

Management 

Front office and ownership

Coaching staff

Statistics

Appearances and goals 

|}

Starting XI

Top scorers 

{| class="wikitable" style="font-size: 95%; text-align: center;"
|-
!width=60|Rank
!width=60|Nation
!width=60|Number
!width=150|Name
!width=80|Total
!width=80|MLS
!width=80|MLS Cup Playoffs
!width=80|U.S. Open Cup
!width=80|Carolina Challenge Cup
|-
|1
|
|13
|Chris Pontius
|12
|12
|0
|0
|0
|-
|2
|
|9
|Hamdi Salihi
|9
|6
|0
|1
|2
|-
|3
|
|29
|Maicon Santos
|8
|7
|0
|0
|1
|-
|rowspan=2|4
|
|7
|Dwayne De Rosario
|7
|7
|0
|0
|0
|-
|
|18
|Nick DeLeon
|7
|6
|1
|0
|0
|-
| 6
|
|26
|Lionard Pajoy
|3
|3
|0
|0
|0
|-
|rowspan=4|7
|
|8
|Branko Boskovic
|2
|1
|1
|0
|0
|-
|
|4
|Brandon McDonald
|2
|2
|0
|0
|0
|-
|
|24
|Lewis Neal
|2
|2
|0
|0
|0
|-
|
|11
|Marcelo Saragosa
|2
|1
|0
|1
|0
|-
|rowspan=6|11
|
|2
|Danny Cruz
|1
|1
|0
|0
|0
|-
|
|3
|Robbie Russell
|1
|1
|0
|0
|0
|-
|
|5
|Dejan Jaković
|1
|1
|0
|0
|0
|-
|
|21
|Daniel Woolard
|1
|1
|0
|0
|0
|-
|
|27
|Long Tan
|1
|1
|0
|0
|0
|-
|
|14
|Josh Wolff
|1
|0
|0
|1
|0
|-

Top assists 

{| class="wikitable" style="font-size: 95%; text-align: center;"
|-
!width=60|Rank
!width=60|Nation
!width=60|Number
!width=150|Name
!width=80|Total
!width=80|MLS
!width=80|MLS Cup Playoffs
!width=80|U.S. Open Cup
!width=80|Carolina Challenge Cup
|-
|1
|
|7
|Dwayne De Rosario
|12
|12
|0
|0
|0
|-
|2
|
|8
|Branko Bošković
|9
|7
|0
|1
|1
|-
|rowspan="2"|3
|
|18
|Nick DeLeon
|5
|4
|0
|1
|0
|-
|
|14
|Andy Najar
|5
|4
|0
|0
|1
|-
|rowspan=2|4
|
|4
|Brandon McDonald
|4
|4
|0
|0
|0
|-
|
|13
|Chris Pontius
|4
|4
|0
|0
|0
|-
|rowspan="3"|5
|
|2
|Danny Cruz
|3
|3
|0
|0
|0
|-
|
|22
|Chris Korb
|3
|3
|0
|0
|0
|-
|
|29
|Maicon Santos
|3
|2
|0
|1
|0
|-
|6
|
|21
|Daniel Woolard
|2
|2
|0
|0
|0
|-
|rowspan="8"|7
|
|11
|Marcelo Saragosa
|1
|1
|0
|0
|0
|-
|
|16
|Josh Wolff
|1
|1
|0
|0
|0
|-
|
|20
|Stephen King
|1
|1
|0
|0
|0
|-
|
|23
|Perry Kitchen
|1
|1
|0
|0
|0
|-
|
|24
|Lewis Neal
|1
|1
|0
|0
|0
|-
|
|26
|Lionard Pajoy
|1
|1
|0
|0
|0
|-
|
|3
|Robbie Russell
|1
|0
|1
|0
|0
|-
|
|15
|Ethan White
|1
|0
|0
|0
|1
|-

MLS Player of the Month

MLS Player of the Week

MLS Best XI of the Week

Transfers

In

Out

Loan in

Loan out

Allocations

Allocation ranking 
D.C. United is in the #7 position in the MLS Allocation Ranking. The allocation ranking is the mechanism used to determine which MLS club has first priority to acquire a U.S. National Team player who signs with MLS after playing abroad, or a former MLS player who returns to the league after having gone to a club abroad for a transfer fee. A ranking can be traded, provided that part of the compensation received in return is another club's ranking.

International roster slots 

D.C. United has six international roster slots. Each club in MLS is allocated eight international roster spots, which can be traded. D.C. United traded one slot to Los Angeles Galaxy on February 7, 2011 for use during the 2011 and 2012 seasons and another slot to Portland Timbers on February 6, 2012 for use during the 2012 and 2013 seasons. The remaining roster slots must belong to domestic players. For clubs based in the United States, a domestic player is either a U.S. citizen, a permanent resident (green card holder) or the holder of other special status (e.g., refugee or asylum status).

As of June 28, 2012, United has used all six international roster spots on the following players: Canadian Dejan Jakovic, Montenegrin Branko Bošković, Brazilian Maicon Santos, Argentine Emiliano Dudar, Albanian Hamdi Salihi, and Englishman Lewis Neal.

Future draft picks

See also 
 2012 Major League Soccer
 2012 MLS Cup Playoffs
 2012 MLS Reserve Division
 2012 U.S. Open Cup
 2012 D.C. United Women season

References 

D.C. United seasons
Dc United
2012 in sports in Washington, D.C.